Lake Independence, often known simply as Lake I, is an electoral constituency in the Belize District represented in the House of Representatives of the National Assembly of Belize since 2015 by Cordel Hyde. Hyde previously served as area representative from 1998 to 2012.

Profile

The Lake Independence constituency was one of 10 new seats created for the 1984 general election. It occupies portions of western and southern Belize City, bordering the Belize Rural Central, Freetown, Pickstock, Collet and Port Loyola constituencies.

Area Representatives

Elections

References

Belizean House constituencies established in 1984
Political divisions in Belize